Sorin Mihai Căliniuc (born 12 July 1996) is a Romanian professional kickboxer and Olympic boxer, and former kempo practitioner. He currently competes in the Lightweight division for Glory. A professional competitor since 2018, Căliniuc formerly competed in the Colosseum Tournament, in which he was the reigning champion of the lightweight and super lightweight divisions. Căliniuc is a multiple national  boxing champion and 2016 Kempo World Champion. 

As of 4 January 2023, Căliniuc  is ranked the #16 lightweight in the world in the kickboxing/Muay Thai combined ranking by Boxemag.

Professional kickboxing career

Early career
Căliniuc practiced judo from 4 to 15 years old. He then started kickboxing at the age of 17, but not at a professional level. Căliniuc worked simultaneously as a casino security guard until he met coach and promoter Estéfano Tănăsescu Popescu who enrolled him to a gym.

Wins over Milea, Salvador and Dzhaniev
With a background of being IKF world kempo champion, Căliniuc began his kickboxing career by winning his first four fights by decision. He initially fought for SAS Gym (a Bucharest-based kickboxing promotion), where he won the SAS Gym 01 and the SAS Gym 02 tournaments.

Căliniuc faced Bogdan Costan on November 2, 2018, in the semifinals of the Lightweight Tournament at SAS Gym 01. Căliniuc won the fight via unanimous decision to progress to the final round of the tournament. He then faced Colosseum Tournament World Lightweight Champion Cristian Milea in the finals. Căliniuc defeated Milea via unanimous decision.

Căliniuc faced former Glory lightweight championship challenger Dylan Salvador on June 13, 2019, in the semifinals of the Lightweight Tournament at SAS Gym 02. Căliniuc won the fight via split decision to progress to the final round of the tournament. He then faced Muay Thai standout Khayal Dzhaniev in the finals. Căliniuc defeated Dzhaniev via unanimous decision.

Colosseum Tournament
In December 2020, it was announced that Căliniuc had signed a multi-fight deal with Colosseum Tournament.

Căliniuc faced Colosseum Tournament world lightweight champion Andrei Ostrovanu on December 18, 2020, at Colosseum Tournament 22. Căliniuc defeated Ostrovanu via unanimous 3-round decision to become the inaugural Colosseum Tournament World Super Lightweight Champion.

Two-division champion
In January 2021, it was officially announced that Căliniuc next bout would be against former ISKA world middleweight champion Gabriel Bozan for the vacant Colosseum Tournament World Lightweight Championship on 26 February at Colosseum Tournament 23. Căliniuc dominated the fight and won via unanimous 5-round decision to become the Colosseum Tournament World Lightweight Champion.

In April 2021, Colosseum Tournament announced that Căliniuc would make his first defence of his lightweight title against former KOK lightweight champion Vitalie Matei at Colosseum Tournament 25 on 31 May in Cluj-Napoca. He won the fight via unanimous 5-round decision.

Căliniuc vs. Koprivlenski
Căliniuc was scheduled to defend his title for the second time against former Glory Lightweight Contender Tournament Winner Stoyan Koprivlenski on September 20, 2021 at Colosseum Tournament 27. He retained his championship, being declared the winner via split decision.

Căliniuc was scheduled to defend his title for the third time against former Kunlun Fight World MAX Tournament Champion Dzianis Zuev on April 8, 2022 at Colosseum Tournament 30. However, due to the Russian invasion of Ukraine, Zuev removed from the card and he was replaced by Andre Mannaart's Sami Lamiri. Căliniuc dominated the bout, taking Lamiri down in the third round. He defeated Lamiri via unanimous decision.

Căliniuc was finally scheduled to make his third title defense against former Wu Lin Feng World Championship Champion Nafi Bilalovski (Filip Verlinden Gym) on June 23, 2022, at Colosseum Tournament 33. He won the fight via unanimous decision.

Căliniuc was once again scheduled to defend his title against WKN World Super Welterweight Champion Jordi Requejo, in September, 2022, at Colosseum Tournament 35. He won a unanimous decision, dominating Requejo.

On October 30, 2022, his team announced on social media that Căliniuc parted ways with Colosseum Tournament. Subsequently, Căliniuc signed a multi-fight contract with Glory on 13 December 2022.

GLORY
In his Glory promotional debut, Căliniuc is expected to face former ISKA World Light Middleweight Champion Arman Hambaryan on February 11, 2023, at GLORY 83.

Personal life
Căliniuc is a Christian.

He said his model is Daniel Ghiță. Căliniuc is inspired by Abdulrashid Sadulaev.

He is a fan of Steaua București.

Championships and accomplishments

Kickboxing
Colosseum Tournament
Colosseum Tournament World Lightweight Championship (One time)
 Four successful title defenses
Colosseum Tournament World Super Lightweight Championship (One time)
SAS Gym
SAS Gym 02 Lightweight Tournament Championship
SAS Gym 01 Lightweight Tournament Championship

Kempo
International Kempo Federation
2016 IKF World Kempo Championships Full-Kempo Rules  −75.0 kg 
2017 IKF European Kempo Championships Full-Kempo Rules  −80.0 kg

Boxing
Romanian Boxing Federation
2022 Romanian Boxing Cup  −75.0 kg
2021 Romania National Boxing Championships  −80.0 kg
2020 Romania National Boxing Championships  −75.0 kg
2020 Romanian Boxing Cup  −75.0 kg

Professional kickboxing record

|- style="background:#fbb;"
| 2023-02-11 || Loss ||align=left| Arman Hambaryan || GLORY 83 || Essen, Germany || Decision (split) || 3 || 3:00 || 11-1-0 
|-
|- style="background:#cfc;"
| 2022-09-30 || Win ||align=left| Jordi Requejo || Colosseum Tournament 35: Căliniuc vs. Requejo || Târgoviște, Romania || Decision (unanimous) || 5 || 3:00 || 11-0-0 
|-
! style=background:white colspan=9 |
|- style="background:#cfc;"
| 2022-06-23 || Win ||align=left| Nafi Bilalovski || Colosseum Tournament 33: Căliniuc vs. Bilalovski || Bucharest, Romania || Decision (unanimous) || 5 || 3:00 || 10-0-0 
|-
! style=background:white colspan=9 |
|- style="background:#cfc;" 
| 2022-04-08 || Win ||align=left| Sami Lamiri || Colosseum Tournament 30: Căliniuc vs. Lamiri || Malmö, Sweden || Decision (unanimous) || 3 || 3:00 || 9-0-0 
|- style="background:#cfc;"
| 2021-09-20 || Win ||align=left| Stoyan Koprivlenski || Colosseum Tournament 27: Căliniuc vs. Koprivlenski || Oradea, Romania || Decision (split) || 5 || 3:00 || 8-0-0 
|-
! style=background:white colspan=9 |
|- style="background:#cfc;"
| 2021-05-31 ||Win ||align=left| Vitalie Matei || Colosseum Tournament 25: Căliniuc vs. Matei || Cluj-Napoca, Romania || Decision (unanimous) || 5 || 3:00 || 7-0-0 
|-
! style=background:white colspan=9 |
|- style="background:#cfc;"
| 2021-02-26 || Win ||align=left| Gabriel Bozan || Colosseum Tournament 23: Căliniuc vs. Bozan || Bucharest, Romania || Decision (unanimous) || 5 || 3:00 || 6-0-0 
|-
! style=background:white colspan=9 |
|- style="background:#cfc;"
| 2020-12-18 || Win ||align=left| Andrei Ostrovanu || Colosseum Tournament 22: Ostrovanu vs. Căliniuc || Bucharest, Romania || Decision (unanimous) || 3 || 3:00 || 5-0-0 
|-
! style=background:white colspan=9 |
|- style="background:#cfc;"
| 2019-06-13 || Win ||align=left| Khayal Dzhaniev || SAS Gym 02, Final || Bucharest, Romania || Decision (unanimous) || 3 || 3:00 || 4-0-0 
|-
! style=background:white colspan=9 |
|- style="background:#cfc;"
| 2019-06-13 || Win ||align=left| Dylan Salvador || SAS Gym 02, Semifinals || Bucharest, Romania || Decision (split) || 3 || 3:00 || 3-0-0 
|- style="background:#cfc;"
| 2018-11-02 || Win ||align=left| Cristian Milea || SAS Gym 01, Final || Bucharest, Romania || Extra round decision (unanimous) || 4 || 3:00 || 2-0-0 
|-
! style=background:white colspan=9 |
|- style="background:#cfc;"
| 2018-11-02 || Win ||align=left| Bogdan Costan || SAS Gym 01, Semifinals || Bucharest, Romania || Decision (unanimous) || 3 || 3:00 || 1-0-0
|-
| colspan=9 | Legend:

See also
List of male kickboxers

References

External links
 Sorin Căliniuc at GLORY 
 
 Sorin Căliniuc  at Tapology.com

1996 births
Living people
Sportspeople from Bucharest
Romanian male kickboxers
Middleweight kickboxers
Romanian male boxers
Middleweight boxers
Light-heavyweight boxers
Kenpō
Romanian Christians
Kickboxing champions
Glory kickboxers